Paul Anders Ogren (born May 9, 1951) was an American politician, carpenter, and farmer.

Ogren lived in Aitkin, Minnesota and was a farmer and carpenter. He went to Loyola Marymount University in Los Angeles, California, to study political science, and to University of Minnesota. Ogren was married to Sandra Gardebring Ogren, who served on the Minnesota Supreme Court. Ogren served in the Minnesota House of Representatives from 1981 to 1992 and was a Democrat.

References

1951 births
Living people
People from Aitkin, Minnesota
American carpenters
Farmers from Minnesota
Loyola Marymount University alumni
University of Minnesota alumni
Democratic Party members of the Minnesota House of Representatives